The Paris bridges with "Passerelle" in their names (generally with the meaning "foot bridge") include the following:

 Passerelle Debilly
 Passerelle Léopold-Sédar-Senghor
 Passerelle Simone-de-Beauvoir, which also accommodates bicycles